Rajko Brežančić (born 21 August 1989) is a Serbian professional footballer who plays as a defender for Radnički Beograd.

Club career
After coming through the youth system at Partizan, Brežančić signed his first professional contract with the club on 1 June 2007, penning a five-year deal. He subsequently went on loan to Teleoptik and Bežanija in order to get experience. In January 2009, Brežančić returned to Partizan and made seven league appearances until the end of the 2008–09 season, as the club won the title. He recorded three more during the first part of the 2009–10 season, before moving on loan to Teleoptik again in January 2010.

In the summer of 2010, Brežančić signed with Serbian SuperLiga club Metalac Gornji Milanovac. He would be loaned to Serbian First League side Bežanija in the 2011 winter transfer window. Six months later, Brežančić signed a permanent contract with Bežanija and stayed there for the next two seasons.

In the summer of 2013, Brežančić was transferred to newly promoted SuperLiga club Čukarički. He made 29 league appearances and scored once in the 2013–14 campaign. In the following season, Brežančić again missed only one out of 30 league games and scored one goal, as Čukarički finished in third place. He also helped the team win the 2014–15 Serbian Cup.

On 4 August 2015, Brežančić signed a three-year contract with Dutch club AZ. He made his official debut for the team in a 3–1 away league win over De Graafschap on 12 September 2015, scoring the opener early in the game.

In August 2016, Brežančić was transferred to Spain and joined Segunda División club Huesca. He contributed with 30 appearances during the 2017–18 season, as the club gained promotion to the top flight for the first time ever. On 11 November 2018, Brežančić made his La Liga debut in a 2–1 away loss to Alavés, replacing injured Pablo Insua.

On 31 January 2019, Brežančić terminated his contract with Huesca and signed an 18-month deal with Málaga.

On 21 June 2019, Brežančić signed a three-year contract with Partizan, returning to the club after nine years. He made 16 appearances across all competitions in his first season back at the club, scoring a goal in a 2–2 away league draw against Napredak Kruševac. After the appointment of Aleksandar Stanojević as manager in September 2020, Brežančić appeared in only two official matches over his last two seasons.

International career
Brežančić represented Serbia and Montenegro at the 2006 UEFA Under-17 Championship. He also played for Serbia U19 in the team's unsuccessful qualifying campaign for the 2008 UEFA European Under-19 Championship. In early 2009, Brežančić participated with the under-20 team at the Qatar International Friendship Tournament.

Brežančić made his debut for the Serbia national under-21 team in a 4–1 friendly win over the Macedonia U21s on 7 June 2009. He was subsequently a member of the team at the 2009 UEFA Under-21 Championship, but failed to make any appearance at the tournament. Brežančić gained his second cap for the under-21 side in a 1–0 home friendly win over Israel U21 on 11 August 2009. His third and last appearance for the team came in another friendly, a 1–3 loss away to Romania U21 on 26 May 2010.

Career statistics

Honours
Partizan
 Serbian SuperLiga: 2008–09
 Serbian Cup: 2008–09
Čukarički
 Serbian Cup: 2014–15
Individual
 Serbian SuperLiga Team of the Season: 2014–15

Notes

References

External links
 
 
 

Association football defenders
AZ Alkmaar players
Eredivisie players
Expatriate footballers in Spain
Expatriate footballers in the Netherlands
FK Bežanija players
FK Čukarički players
FK Metalac Gornji Milanovac players
FK Partizan players
FK Radnički Beograd players
FK Teleoptik players
La Liga players
Málaga CF players
People from Vlasenica
SD Huesca footballers
Segunda División players
Serbia under-21 international footballers
Serbia youth international footballers
Serbian expatriate footballers
Serbian expatriate sportspeople in Spain
Serbian expatriate sportspeople in the Netherlands
Serbian First League players
Serbian footballers
Serbian SuperLiga players
Serbs of Bosnia and Herzegovina
1989 births
Living people